Matthew Lamar Rogers (born December 3, 1987) is an American former professional basketball player. He played college basketball for Southwest Baptist University before playing professionally in the NBA Development League, Lebanon, Spain, the Philippines, Qatar and New Zealand.

High school career
Rogers attended Doniphan High School in Doniphan, Missouri where he was a two-time second-team All-State selection, as well as a McDonald's All-American nominee.

College career
In his freshman season at Southwest Baptist, Rogers led the league in blocks and earned All-MIAA defensive team honors. In 28 games, he averaged 7.4 points, 5.7 rebounds and 2.9 blocks per game.

In his sophomore season, he finished second overall in blocks with 136 as well as being named in the 2008 All-MIAA first team and defensive team, subsequently also winning the defensive player of the year award. In 30 games, he averaged 14.9 points, 7.8 rebounds, 4.5 blocks and 1.8 assists per game.

In his junior season, he again led the league in blocks with 123 as well as being named in the 2009 All-MIAA first team and defensive team, winning the defensive player of the year award for the second year in a row. In 30 games, he averaged 18.3 points, 8.7 rebounds, 1.5 assists, 4.1 blocks and 1.0 steals per game.

In his senior season, he was named in the 2010 All-MIAA first team and defensive team. He had been averaging 21.8 points, 8.8 rebounds and 3.6 blocks per game before suffering a season-ending right ACL injury in February.

Professional career

Texas Legends
After going undrafted in the 2010 NBA draft, Rogers signed with the Charlotte Bobcats on September 28. However, he was later waived by the Bobcats on October 21 after appearing in three preseason games. On November 1, he was selected with the fourth overall pick in the 2010 NBA Development League Draft by the Texas Legends. He was the first ever draft pick in Texas Legends history. In 51 games for the Legends in 2010–11, he averaged 7.2 points, 4.2 rebounds and 1.1 blocks per game.

On October 7, 2011, Rogers re-signed with the Legends for the 2011–12 season. On December 10, 2011, he signed with the Indiana Pacers, but was later waived by the team on December 23 after appearing in one preseason game. Two days later, he returned to Texas and continued playing for the Legends until being waived by the team on March 22, 2012. Later that month, he signed with Lebanese team Byblos Club for the rest of the season.

Spain and Philippines
In July 2012, Rogers joined the Indiana Pacers for the 2012 NBA Summer League.

In September 2012, Rogers signed with Coruña of Spain for the 2012–13 season. In December 2012, he left Coruña after appearing in 11 games for the club. In January 2013, he signed with the San Mig Super Coffee Mixers for the 2013 Commissioner's Cup. He left after appearing in just one game, and the following month, he signed with the Petron Blaze Boosters. He played two games in ASEAN Basketball League.

On April 5, 2013, Rogers signed with Qatari team Al-Arabi where he spent the rest of the season.

New Zealand
In January 2014, Rogers signed with the Canterbury Rams for the 2014 New Zealand NBL season. He appeared in all 18 games for the Rams, averaging 16.6 points, 6.1 rebounds, 1.2 assists and a league-leading 2.6 blocks per game.

Personal
Rogers is the son of Wade and LaDonna Rogers. He is married to wife, Rachael.

A devoted Christian, Rogers states religion is a massive part of his life thanks to his father being a pastor.

References

External links
Eurobasket.com profile
SW Baptist bio
NBA D-League profile

1987 births
Living people
American expatriate basketball people in New Zealand
American expatriate basketball people in Lebanon
American expatriate basketball people in Qatar
American expatriate basketball people in Spain
American expatriate basketball people in the Philippines
Basketball players from Missouri
Canterbury Rams players
Centers (basketball)
People from Doniphan, Missouri
Power forwards (basketball)
Southwest Baptist Bearcats men's basketball players
Texas Legends players
American men's basketball players
Philippine Basketball Association imports
Magnolia Hotshots players
ASEAN Basketball League players